Huỳnh Phúc Hiệp (born 12 April 1988 in Tiền Giang, Vietnam) is a Vietnamese footballer who is a striker for Tiền Giang. He was called to Vietnamese internationals, played at the 2007 AFC Asian Cup.

References

External links 
 

1988 births
Living people
Vietnamese footballers
Association football midfielders
Xuan Thanh Saigon Cement FC players
Vietnam international footballers